Bajho was a town and Village Development Committee  in Ilam District in the Province No. 1 of eastern Nepal. At the time of the 1991 Nepal census, it had a population of 20,218 people living in 3586 individual households.

It was superseded by rural municipality in 2017.

References

External links
UN map of the municipalities of Ilam District

Populated places in Ilam District